The Grenadiers and Rifles Guards Regiment is a regiment of the Royal Netherlands Army; along with the Garderegiment Fuseliers Prinses Irene it is one of the two Dutch Guard regiments.

History
The two antecedent regiments were formed in 1829 following the withdrawal of the regiments of Swiss mercenaries from Dutch service. Willem I ordered that two regiments would be formed to replace the Swiss, to serve as his guards. Both served with distinction, especially during the Second World War in the defence of The Hague. The regiment was formed in 1995 by the amalgamation of two antecedent regiments, the Garderegiment Grenadiers and the Garderegiment Jagers.

Organization
The regiment's single battalion currently serves in the airmobile role as part of 11 Luchtmobiele (Airmobile) Brigade. It is organised with an HQ Company (Stafcompagnie), a heavy weapons company (Zwarewapenscompagnie) and three infantry companies (Infanteriecompagnie). The three infantry companies and the anti-tank company perpetuate the two antecedent regiments, with 'A' (Koningscompagnie) and 'D' (Wolvencompagnie) companies being classed as Grenadiers and 'B' (Stiercompagnie) and 'C' (Tijgercompagnie) Companies being classed as Jagers (Rifles).

The regiment has a museum in Arnhem.

Bands
Serving the Guards in musical support,  the few numbers of military bands in service, are the Royal Military Band "Johan Willem Friso" and the Traditional Grenadier Bugle Band of the Grenadiers' and Rifles Guard Regiment (Grenadiers) and the Veterans Fanfare band and Bugles and Fanfare orchestra of the Grenadiers and Rifles (Rifles). These are the only bands in service in the Guards units of the RNA as the Band and Corps of Drums of the Garderegiment Fuseliers Prinses Irene remain disbanded. The present day fanfare brass band (known as the Regimentsfanfare) consists of 21 musicians and a permanent conductor. It has existed since 5 September 2005. A brass quintet has existed within the regiment since 2007.

Battle honours
Tiendaagse Veldtocht 1831 
Ypenburg en Ockenburg 1940 
West-Java 1946 - 1949 
East Java 1947 - 1949
Sangin 2007
Metalen Kruis

Gallery

References

External links
Garderegiment Grenadiers en Jagers

Garderegiment Grenadiers
Royal guards
Guards regiments
Dutch ceremonial units
Dutch monarchy
Grenadier regiments